The Rainbow Fish is a children's picture book drawn and written by Swiss author and illustrator, Marcus Pfister, and translated into English by J. Alison James.  The book is best known for the distinctive shiny foil scales of the Rainbow Fish. Decode Entertainment turned the story into an animated television series of the same name, which aired on the HBO Family television channel in the United States and Teletoon in Canada from 1999 until 2000.

Plot
The story is about a small rainbowfish with shiny, multi-coloured scales. He has blue, green, purple, and pink scales. Interspersed with these colorful scales are shiny, holographic scales which are his favorites. The other fish from his shoal also have scales, but only scales matching to their real colors. However, they wish that they had shiny silver scales just like Rainbow Fish. One day, a small blue fish (named Blue in the TV series) who envied the shiny silver scales asks the Rainbow Fish if he could have one of his. The Rainbow Fish refuses in a rude manner. The small blue fish tells all the other fish that The Rainbow Fish was being rude, and as a result, the other fish do not want to play with him any more.

His only remaining friend, the starfish, tells him to go visit the wise octopus (named Wanda in the TV series) for advice. When he goes to the cave where she lives, he sees Wanda the octopus. Wanda (in a deep voice) says that she has been waiting for him. Then she explains that the waves have told her his story. Then, she gives The Rainbow Fish her advice: He must share his scales with the other fish. She continues that he might no longer be the most beautiful fish after that, but he will discover how to be happy. The Rainbow Fish tries to say that he cannot share his favorite scales, but Wanda disappears in a cloud of ink.

When he encounters the little blue fish for a second time, The Rainbow Fish shares one of his precious silver scales and sees the little fish's joy. With that one shiny scale gone, he immediately feels much better. Very soon, the Rainbow Fish is surrounded by the other fish requesting scales and he shares one of his shiny silver scales with each of them. Soon, everyone in the ocean has one shiny scale, including The Rainbow Fish. The Rainbow Fish is finally happy even though he shared all his scales and only had one shiny scale left.

Theme
A Publishers Weekly reviewer called the book a "cautionary tale about selfishness and vanity".

Its central theme is about the importance of sharing with others and how that leads to happiness.

Origin of the Rainbow Fish
The Rainbow Fish was originally published in 1992. At that time, Marcus Pfister suggested using holographic foil for the scales, a technique used in graphic design but not yet seen in children's books. Pfister says in an interview, "The expense was a big issue. Because of the foil, each copy of the book cost double the amount of the normal price of producing a book. With the cost, it was quite difficult for Davy [the editor] to decide whether to do the foil. So we decided that I’d get only 50% of my usual royalties for the book, and only that way was it possible to make it work."

The Rainbow Fish was developed from another book Pfister had previously illustrated, The Sleepy Owl. In an interview with Publishers Weekly, Pfister said, "Well, I had published some other books after The Sleepy Owl – there were some Christmas books and Penguin Pete – but Brigitte Sidjanski, founder of NordSud, had always liked my first book, and suggested I do another book similar to that. So I thought that if a new book was to have something in common with that book, the character should resemble an owl. But I really didn’t want to draw another bird. Then one day, I had a copy of The Sleepy Owl by my desk, and I looked closely at that character, and I realized I could create a fish character that would be quite similar to the owl. So the feathers became scales. And then I began thinking about the story, and I came up with the idea of a colorful fish."

Book series

There are sequels in the Rainbow Fish book series:

 Rainbow Fish to the Rescue!: About the acceptance and integration of foreigners. 
 Rainbow Fish and the Big Blue Whale: About arguments and how to settle them.
 The Rainbow Fish and the Sea Monsters' Cave: About irrational and rational fears.
 Rainbow Fish Finds his Way: With the help of his new friends, Rainbow Fish finds his way back home.
 Rainbow Fish Discovers the Deep Sea: About modesty and happiness.
 Good Night, Little Rainbow Fish: About the love between mother and child. 
 You Can't Win Them All, Rainbow Fish: About fairness and good sportsmanship.
 Rainbow Fish and the Storyteller: About lies and exaggeration.

There is also a Spanish language edition of The Rainbow Fish, El Pez Arco Iris, as well as bilingual editions in English paired with Spanish, Arabic, Chinese, Japanese, Korean, French, German, Italian, Russian, and Vietnamese.

Five Rainbow Fish stories, The Rainbow Fish; Rainbow Fish and the Big Blue Whale; Rainbow Fish Discovers the Deep Sea; You Can’t Win Them All, Rainbow Fish; and Good Night, Little Rainbow Fish are featured in the collection, The Rainbow Fish and His Friends.

Acclaim

The Rainbow Fish has sold over 30 million copies internationally, and has been released in 50 languages (currently available in 37).

From Romper: The Rainbow Fish follows a little fish in the ocean, but, as readers learn, this isn’t just an average, everyday fish, it’s “the most beautiful fish in the entire ocean.” Unlike ordinary fish, this one has gorgeous, sparkly scales in various shades of beautiful colors. The fish could keep all of his beauty to himself, but instead, he shares it with his friends and feels immense joy in doing so. This book is full of gorgeous artwork.

From School Library Journal: The delicate watercolors of underwater scenes are a perfect foil to the glittering scales that eventually form a part of each fish's exterior. This is certainly a story written to convey a message, but in its simplicity, it recalls the best of Lionni. Besides, what three-year-old doesn't need reinforcement about sharing?

Booklist said "Will fascinate preschoolers."

Awards and Accolades: 
 #1 Publishers Weekly Bestseller
 Wall Street Journal Bestseller
 An IRA-CBC Children's Choice
 Winner of the Bologna Book Fair Critici in Erba Prize
 A Christopher Award Winner

The late Ernest Borgnine read The Rainbow Fish as part of Storyline Online.

Model Winnie Harlow read The Rainbow Fish as part of the #SavewithStories program led by Jennifer Garner.

Website
The Rainbow Fish has his own website at www.rainbowfish.us. The website features information about the series as well as educator resources and product links.

Short film
On March 25, 1997, an animated adaptation of the story book was released on VHS and DVD (known as The Rainbow Fish and Dazzle the Dinosaur). The home video releases also contain the film Dazzle the Dinosaur which is based on another book written by Pfister and published in 1994. The animated short film features a song called "Giving Makes You Special". In Dazzle the Dinosaur, the imaginary dinosaur named Dazzle is an egg (separated from another family and is at first an orphan). Although it is not specified what kind of dinosaur he is, he is possibly an Ouranosaurus (relative of Iguanodon; or in other words a dinosaur from the Iguanodontidae family). Then he adopts a young female Maiasaura from a Maiasaura family and herd. Her name is Maia the Maiasaura. In this story, they try to get the no-good Dragonsaurus (which terrified the Maiasauruses) to give them back their old home (which had once been in a cave). The duo (Dazzle and Maia) see a Apatosaurus. Then they tell him the truth about their old home (their cave) which the Dragonsaurus had moved in to. When the Quetzalcoatlus takes Dazzle and Maia to the cave (which the Dragonsaurus had moved in). But he warns them he and his flock leave at sunset. Because he is not staying when the Dragonsaurus comes around (saying to them, "I am never again coming back to that cave once the Dragonsaurus is awake!"). The Dragonsaurus does give it back in the end, and Dazzle, Maia, and all the other Maiasauruses are able to return to their old home. The dinosaurs in this story are Apatosaurus, Stegosaurus, Quetzalcoatlus, Deinonychus, Tyrannosaurus, Ouranosaurus (that being Dazzle), and Dragonsaurus.

Cast
Tom Arntzen as Narrator
Cheralynn Bailey as Starfish
Jay Brazeau as Quetzalcoatlus 
Alex Doduck as Fish with Gray fins
Marcy Goldberg as Stegosaurus
David Kaye  as Apatasauras 
Campbell Lane as Barracuda & Dragonsaurus
Blu Mankuma as Lobster
Shirley Milliner as Wise Octopus
David Morse as Rainbow Fish
Tegan Moss as Fish with Viridian Fins
Eric Pospisil as Dazzle
Kaitlyn Stewart as Maia
Chantal Strand as Little Blue Fish
Sarah Strange as Mother Maiasaura 
Veronica Sztopa as Fish with Yellow-Green Fins
Chris Turner as Fish with Turquoise fins

Television series

The Rainbow Fish was adapted into a children's animated television series in 1999. However, the television series does not follow the plot of the book; rather it takes the character and the setting and creates a new story with them. Some characters were added and others embellished for the purposes of the show. In the series, the place where the fish live is called Neptune Bay (after Neptune, god of the sea). The fish attend school, which is aptly named "The School of Fish". There is a shipwreck called "Shipwreck Park" in the series that resembles the wreck of the RMS Titanic. It was produced by Decode Entertainment and Yoram Gross-EM.TV. 26 episodes were produced.

Author
In an interview with Publishers Weekly, Marcus Pfister said "while I was at the Art School of Bern, I came to know about all the major Swiss children’s book illustrators. The other students and I would talk about how nice it would be to illustrate children’s books. At that point it was a dream, and only a few guys tried to realize this dream."

Criticism
Some critics have asserted that The Rainbow Fish "promotes socialism", or collectivist values. From this perspective it has been alleged that, "...the message this book sends to children about envy, entitlement, uniformity and mediocrity [is problematic]. Not to mention the bullying and shaming used by the scaleless fish to get what he wants." Ira Stoll, another critic of The Rainbow Fish on anti-socialist grounds, claims that Amazon.com reviews of the book were evenly divided between those in favor of the book (and the values that it promotes), and those reviews that were more critical.

In the June 2019 issue of Reason magazine, libertarian journalist Matt Welch wrote an article titled "Don't Be Like the Rainbow Fish", in which he described the ways in which the Rainbow Fish in the book acted quite differently from that of the author of the book, Marcus Pfister, in Welch's view. Welch derides the process in which the Rainbow Fish in the book gave away its scales, and become "colorless", as contrasting starkly with the colorful methods and materials Pfister himself would have used in order to produce the actual book, which ultimately went on to sell millions of copies. Welch said, "Whereas Rainbow Fish achieves transcendence through literally becoming colorless, the exact opposite was the case for The Rainbow Fish. Using an expensive and novel combination of holographic foil stamping and watercolor, the Swiss-born Pfister and his publisher, NorthSouth Books, produced a striking visual package that proved irresistible. 'The effect of the stamping was so nice that all the bookshops here in Switzerland put it in the windows,' Pfister recalled in a 2013 interview with Publishers Weekly. 'We decided that I'd get only 50 percent of my usual royalties for the book, and only that way was it possible to make it work.'"

Former conservative radio host Neal Boortz said that The Rainbow Fish in his view was, "...one of the biggest pieces of trash children's books ever published" for the similar reasons to that of Welch, as Welch states in the Reason article, "...[the Rainbow Fish] only gets truly ostracized because he won't hand over his body parts on demand, in the name of equality."

References

External links
 http://www.marcuspfister.ch
 http://www.rainbowfish.us
 http://www.northsouth.com

1992 children's books
Picture books
Swiss children's literature
Children's books adapted into television shows
Fish in popular culture